Ariadhoo (Dhivehi: އަރިއަދޫ) is one of the uninhabited islands of Alif Dhaal Atoll near Maamigili island.

Archaeology
There are important Buddhist remains in this island, including a stupa, indicating that it was inhabited in the past.

References
Divehi Tārīkhah Au Alikameh. Divehi Bahāi Tārikhah Khidmaiykurā Qaumī Markazu. Reprint 1958 edn. Malé 1990.
Divehiraajjege Jōgrafīge Vanavaru. Muhammadu Ibrahim Lutfee. G.Sōsanī.
Xavier Romero-Frias, The Maldive Islanders, A Study of the Popular Culture of an Ancient Ocean Kingdom. Barcelona 1999.

Uninhabited islands of the Maldives